Srimanta Banerjee (born 1 October 1949) is an Indian former cricketer. He played four first-class matches for Bengal between 1977 and 1979.

See also
 List of Bengal cricketers

References

External links
 

1949 births
Living people
Indian cricketers
Bengal cricketers